Gregg Turkington (born November 25, 1967) is an Australian-born American entertainer, actor, musician and writer. He is known for his performances as Neil Hamburger, a stand-up comedian persona he developed in the 1990s. Alongside Tim Heidecker, Turkington also stars as a fictionalized version of himself on the comedic web series On Cinema (2011–). In addition, he formed one-half of the band Zip Code Rapists and has collaborated on numerous projects with musicians including Trey Spruance (Mr. Bungle, Secret Chiefs 3).

In the 1990s, Turkington ran an independent label, Amarillo Records, which distributed his original albums and albums of other artists from the San Francisco punk scene. In 2015, he starred as a variant of the Neil Hamburger character for the feature-length drama film Entertainment, directed by Rick Alverson, and subsequently gave his first interviews as himself instead of an assumed persona. Turkington also was a regular voice actor on the Disney XD series Gravity Falls, and had minor roles in the Marvel Cinematic Universe films Ant-Man (2015) and Ant-Man and the Wasp: Quantumania (2023).

Career

Early career
Turkington rose to prominence in the mid-1980s as the publisher of underground zine Breakfast Without Meat which brought punk respectability to "square" musical artists such as Tiny Tim, Jimmy Webb, the 101 Strings, and Richard Harris through feature articles. A frequent contributor to the zine was Derrick Bostrom of the Meat Puppets.

In the 1980s, Turkington also performed in obscure San Francisco bands such as Caroliner, Hello Kitty on Ice and Bean Church, and worked at Subterranean Records, contributing artwork and live recordings to Flipper's Public Flipper Limited Live 1980-1985 album.

In the early 1990s, Turkington operated the Amarillo Records label, which released works by many artists from San Francisco's post-punk avant-garde music scene. He was a member of The Easy Goings, Totem Pole of Losers and the Zip Code Rapists (with John Singer). He collaborated with Trey Spruance of Mr. Bungle in The Three Doctors, Faxed Head (with James Goode, Trey Spruance, and Phil Franklin), Secret Chiefs 3, Colonel Truth (with Brandan Kearney and Rebecca G. Wilson) and The Bon Larvis Band. Many of these bands appeared on 1996's Amarillo Records compilation CD, You Gan’t Boar Like An Eabla When You Work With Turkrys, along with the likes of Sun City Girls, Thinking Fellers Union Local 282, U.S. Saucer, Harvey Sid Fisher, Dieselhed, and Church of Satan founder Anton Szandor LaVey. He was also a tour manager for both Link Wray and Mr. Bungle. He contributed lead vocals to two tracks by the Secret Chiefs 3.

In the late 1990s, Turkington had abandoned Amarillo Records and all of his musical projects and moved to Melbourne, Australia, where he lived until 2003. Since then, he has written the book Warm Voices Rearranged: Anagram Record Reviews with fellow Three Doctors alumnus Brandan Kearney, also of World of Pooh, Caroliner, and Archipelago Brewing Co. He was a contributing editor to the British version of Maxim in 2005 and 2006, as well as to Johan Kugelberg's 2013 book Enjoy The Experience: Homemade Records 1958–1992.

In 2005 and 2006, after ten years of inactivity, his musical duo Zip Code Rapists did a handful of reunion shows, performing in San Francisco, Saint Paul, Minnesota, Toronto, and Montreal.

He has provided various voices for the animated series The Marvelous Misadventures of Flapjack, Aqua Teen Hunger Force, Adventure Time, Sanjay and Craig, and Gravity Falls. A parody screenplay entitled "Bicycle Built for Two" which was co-written with Tim Heidecker was published in McSweeney's #36 in December 2010.

Turkington appears in the full-length independent drama The Comedy, directed by Rick Alverson and starring Tim Heidecker. The film premiered at the Sundance Film Festival in January 2012.

On Cinema era

Tim Heidecker and Gregg Turkington star in Adult Swim's web series On Cinema at the Cinema, portraying a pair of hapless movie reviewers. Turkington's persona in the series is that of a self-described movie expert, although he rarely provides any useful criticism, lauds forgettable films, and often fails to correctly answer simple trivia questions. The series has run for thirteen seasons thus far, with guest appearances by Jimmy McNichol, Joe Estevez, Sally Kellerman, Candy Clark, Peyton Reed, and John Aprea. In 2013 the On Cinema Film Guide app was released, featuring the voices of Turkington and Heidecker reviewing over 17,000 films. Turkington also co-stars as Special Agent Kington in the On Cinema at the Cinema spin-off series Decker.

Turkington had a role in Marvel Studios' 2015 movie Ant-Man. He appeared in the series finale of CSI: Crime Scene Investigation as bombing suspect Lawrence Territo.

In 2022, Turkington appeared as his On Cinema persona in the episode about The Wizard of Oz of the Shudder movie documentary series Cursed Films.

Neil Hamburger

Turkington is best known for creating anti-comedian Neil Hamburger. In 1992, Turkington released an album of prank phone calls with several tracks featuring an early version of the character and soon after began developing a stand-up comedian persona. The character constantly clears his throat while telling off-paced jokes that, for the most part, fail. Neil's unique brand of comedy has thrilled, perplexed and repulsed audiences worldwide. Since 1998, he has released a number of records on the Drag City record label.

In the 2000s, he appeared on Jimmy Kimmel Live!, Tom Green Live, Tim and Eric Awesome Show, Great Job!, and Fox News' Red Eye. He also appeared in the short film Left For Dead in Malaysia, and had a brief cameo appearance in the 2006 film Tenacious D in The Pick of Destiny. The Neil Hamburger character plays the role of Osric in the 2014 film, Hamlet A.D.D., a live action and animated version of William Shakespeare's Hamlet. He was rumored to appear in his Neil Hamburger persona in Greg Mottola's 2011 ensemble comedy film Paul, but he did not.

Turkington co-wrote and starred in the 2015 feature film Entertainment, directed by Rick Alverson, with a supporting cast including John C. Reilly, Tye Sheridan, Lotte Verbeek, Amy Seimetz, Michael Cera, David Yow, and Annabella Lwin. The film premiered at the Sundance Film Festival in January 2015. While unnamed, the character in the film is a clear adaptation of the Hamburger character.

Personal life
Turkington was born in Darwin, Northern Territory, Australia, to American parents, and grew up in Tempe, Arizona, and San Francisco, California. He lives in Los Angeles with his wife, Simone Turkington. He is a vegan.

Discography

Solo

as Neil Hamburger
1992 – Great Phone Calls Featuring Neil Hamburger – (Amarillo)
1996 – America's Funnyman (Drag City)
1998 – Raw Hamburger (Drag City)
1998 – Neil Hamburger Pays Tribute to Diana, Princess of Wales (EP) (Planet Pimp)
1999 – Left for Dead in Malaysia (Drag City)
2000 – Inside Neil Hamburger (EP) (Drag City)
2000 – 50 States, 50 Laughs (Million Dollar Performances)
2002 – Laugh Out Lord (Drag City)
2003 – Live at Phoenix Greyhound Park DVD (Kung Fu)
2005 – Great Moments at Di Presa's Pizza House (Drag City)
2005 – The World's Funnyman DVD (Drag City)
2007 – Hot February Night (Off-Price Value Center)
2008 – Neil Hamburger Sings Country Winners (Drag City)
2012 – Live at Third Man Records (Third Man Records)
2012 – Margaret Cho and Neil Hamburger (7") (Million Dollar Performances)
2013 – Incident at Cambridge, Mass. (Burger Records)
2014 – First of Dismay (Drag City)
2019 – Still Dwelling (Drag City)

as Totem Pole of Losers
1993 – Jesus, I Am Loving You (Amarillo)

as The Golding Institute
1994 – Sounds of the American Fast Food Restaurants (Planet Pimp)
1997 – Sounds of the San Francisco Adult Book Stores (Planet Pimp)
1998 – Sounds of the International Airport Restrooms (Planet Pimp)
2006 – Final Relaxation (Ipecac)

Collaborations
with the Zip Code Rapists
1992 – Sing And Play The Three Doctors (Amarillo)
1994 – The Man Can't Bust Our Music! (EP) (Ectoplasm)
1994 – Sing And Play The Matador Records Catalog (EP) (Ecstatic Piss)
1995 – 94124 (EP) (Amarillo)
1995 – Live "In Competence" (Beast 666 Tapes)
2005 – Here at Last... Live!!! (Freedom From)
2009 – Sing And Play The Three Doctors (with 24 bonus tracks) (Eabla)

with The Easy Goings
1989 – The Easy Goings (Bee-Fast)
1993 – Cigarettes (Nuf Sed)

with the Three Doctors
1994 – Back To Basics-"Live" (Amarillo)
1995 – Archaeology of the Infinite (Amarillo)

with Faxed Head
1995 – Uncomfortable But Free (Amarillo)
1997 – Exhumed at Birth (Amarillo)
2001 – Chiropractic (Web of Mimicry)
2008 – From Coalinga to Osaka: Live in Japan 1995 (Web of Mimicry)

with Secret Chiefs 3
2007 – Path of Most Resistance (Web of Mimicry)

with Hard-Ons
2011 – American Exports (Alternative Tentacles)

Filmography

Television

Film
{| class = "wikitable sortable"
|-
! Year
! Title
! Role
! Notes
|-
| 1993
| Terminal USA
| Six
| Film debut
|-
| 2003
| Neil Hamburger Live at the Phoenix Greyhound Park
| rowspan="4" | Neil Hamburger
|
|-
| 2006
| The Amazing Adventures of Pleaseeasaur
|
|-
| 2006
| Tenacious D in The Pick of Destiny
|
|-
| 2009
| Coco Lipshitz: Behind the Laughter
| Short film
|-
| 2010
| The Great Intervention
| Josh (voice)
|
|-
| 2012
| The Comedy
| Bobby
|
|-
| 2014
| Hamlet A.D.D.
| Osric
| 
|-
| 2014
| The Begun of Tigtone
| The Cave Demon (voice)
|-
| 2015
| Entertainment
| The Comedian
| Feature film; lead role, co-writer
|-
| 2015
| Ant-Man
| Dale
| 
|-
|-
| 2018
| A Futile and Stupid Gesture
| Advertiser
| 
|-
|2019
|Mister America
|Gregg Turkington
| Also co-producer, co-writer
|-
|2023
|Fremont
|Dr. Anthony
|
|-
| 2023
| Ant-Man and the Wasp: Quantumania| Dale
| 
|}

 Applications 

 Web series 

Bibliography
 2010: Bicycle Built for Two (with Tim Heidecker)
 2019: Brendan Kearney's Official On Cinema at the Cinema Reader Volume 1: 2010–2018'' (with Tim Heidecker and Brendan Kearney)

References

External links
[ Gregg Turkington] at AllMusic

WFMU radio show with guest DJ Gregg Turkington
Neil Hamburger website
Three Doctors Band website

American comedy musicians
American music video directors
American male film actors
American male television actors
American stand-up comedians
Living people
People from Darwin, Northern Territory
People from Tempe, Arizona
People from San Francisco
American male web series actors
21st-century American male actors
Comedians from California
21st-century American comedians
1967 births